Eakins is an English surname.  People with this name include:

Dallas Eakins (born 1967), Canadian ice hockey defenseman and head coach
Jim Eakins (born 1946), American basketball player
John Eakins (1923/4–1998), Canadian politician
Peter Eakins (born 1947), Australian rules footballer
Susan Macdowell Eakins (1851–1938), American artist, wife of Thomas Eakins
Thomas Eakins (1844–1916), American artist

See also
Eakin

English-language surnames